Kim Seong-ok (born March 27, 1967) is a South Korean para table tennis player. 

She won a bronze medal at the 2016 Summer Paralympics in the Women's individual Class 7 table tennis competition.

She had polio at birth.

References 
 

1967 births 
Paralympic medalists in table tennis
Sportspeople from North Jeolla Province 
South Korean female table tennis players 
Table tennis players at the 2016 Summer Paralympics 
Medalists at the 2016 Summer Paralympics 
Paralympic table tennis players of South Korea
Living people
Paralympic bronze medalists for South Korea
People with polio
21st-century South Korean women